Burgh on Bain is a village and civil parish in the East Lindsey district of Lincolnshire, England. According to the 2001  Census it had a population of 114, increasing to 172 at the 2011 census.

Burgh on Bain Grade II listed Anglican church is dedicated to St Helen.

References

External links

Villages in Lincolnshire
Civil parishes in Lincolnshire
East Lindsey District